Robert Mackenzie Johnston F.L.S., (27 November 1843 – 20 April 1918) was a Scottish-Australian statistician and scientist.

Early life
Johnston was born at Petty near Inverness, Scotland, the son of Lachlan Johnstone, a crofter, and his wife Mary, née Mackenzie. Johnston was educated at the village school where his ability was quickly recognized. Johnson was influenced by the life of Hugh Miller, a stonemason and geologist, whose books were lent to him. Johnston obtained work on the railways, read widely, and studied botany, geology, and chemistry at the Andersonian University under Professors Kennedy, Crosskey, and Penny. Glasgow.

Career in Australia
Emigrating to Australia in 1870 he was given a position in the accountant's branch of the Launceston and Western District railway. He transferred to the government service in 1872, authoring  "Field Memoranda for Tasmanian Botanists" (Launceston, 1874). In 1880 he became chief clerk in the Audit Department, his former railway colleagues presented him with a watch inscribed: 

In 1882 Johnston was appointed registrar-general and government statistician. Johnston was appointed a royal commissioner to report on the fisheries of Tasmania, being the author of "Descriptive Catalogue of Tasmanian Fishes" (Hobart, 1882).  Johnston also did much geological work, and in 1888 the government published his Systematic Account of the Geology of Tasmania. He was president of the economic and social science and statistics section at the meeting of the Australasian Association for the Advancement of Science held at Melbourne in 1890, and with the coming of federation he was able to influence very much the special problems of finance that were raised. He originated the scheme of per-capita payments by the Commonwealth to the states that was eventually adopted. Johnston was offered and declined the position of government statist for New South Wales, and declined to be a candidate for the position of Commonwealth statist.

Legacy
Johnston was also interested in all branches of science, in music, and in education. Johnston died at Hobart on 20 April 1918 of heart disease. Johnston received the Imperial Service Order in 1903 and was fellow of the Linnean Society of London and the Royal Geographical Society of Australasia and honorary fellow of the Royal Statistical Society of London. A list of 103 of his papers is given in the Papers and Proceedings of the Royal Society of Tasmania for 1918, of which over 50 are on geological subjects. In 1903 The R. M. Johnston Memorial Volume, being a selection from his more important papers, was published by the Tasmanian government.

Species named in  honor of Robert Mackenzie Johnston include the fish: Johnston's weedfish, Heteroclinus johnstoni, and the Tasmanian yellow gum Eucalyptus johnstonii.

References

1843 births
1918 deaths
Australian statisticians
British emigrants to Australia